Vilana is a Hispanic surname. Notable people with the surname include:

 Ramon de Vilana Perlas (1663–1741), Spanish nobleman
 Ricardo Vilana (born 1981), Brazilian footballer 

Spanish-language surnames